Synaphea intricata is a shrub endemic to Western Australia.

It usually blooms between July and October producing yellow flowers.

It is found on flats and swampy areas in the South West and Great Southern regions of Western Australia where it grows in peaty-sandy soils.

References

Eudicots of Western Australia
intricata
Endemic flora of Western Australia
Plants described in 1995